Bhandara service in Hindu Dharma, is the special  free of cost meal, served to the devotees present in the Temple. Food is wholeheartedly cooked and served also to the needy devotees waiting in short distance to the Temple. Bhandara, a festive occasion as a part of thanksgiving the lord and service to people in Hinduism.

History 
Bhandara a district in Maharashtra which is also known as the “Rice bowl of the country”. Practicing Bhandara is mostly done by rich people, as welfare service to the God after thanksgiving. It also can be organized by any individual (referred to as the Yajamana) who wishes to thank the Lord. This practice began with Hindu religion, 500 years later in 1500-1600 AD Sikhism too adopted this wholesome practice. In Hinduism, after performing the holy rituals and community worshipping the almighty, the Yajamana serves food to the poor and the needy.

The Indian government has introduced a scheme known as ‘'Seva Bhoj Yojna’' to reimburse the government share of the Central Goods and Services Tax and the Integrated Goods and Service Tax for purchases by religious institutions of certain products for providing free meals. It will cover the raw ingredients of meals and is expected to cost a total of Rs. 325.00 Crores in the 2018/2019 fiscal year. To qualify, an institution will need to serve food free of charge to over 5000 people in the year.

See also 
Prasāda
Langar (Sikhism)
Langar (Sufism)

References 

Hindu practices
Hindu culture